Van Zandt County is a county located in the U.S. state of Texas, in the northeastern part of the state. As of the 2020 census, its population was 59,541. Its county seat is Canton. The county is named for Isaac Van Zandt (1813–1847), a member of the Congress of the Republic of Texas.

History
Van Zandt County is commonly known as the Free State of Van Zandt. The title was particularly prevalent through the Reconstruction Era, but is still in use today. Many versions of the county's history may account for this moniker, and historians, even within the county and throughout its existence, do not agree how exactly it became known as the Free State.

One story of how the Free State of Van Zandt came to be originates with the county's formation. In 1848,  Henderson County was split into three counties: Kaufman, Van Zandt, and what remained as Henderson County. Henderson County had been deeply in debt, yet the new Van Zandt County was founded without any obligations. Many believed that this was a mistake on the state's part, and bitter citizens and politicians from Henderson County referred to the new county as the Free State.

Van Zandt County tried on two distinct occasions to separate itself from Texas. The first was in 1861 when Texas seceded from the United States. About 350 citizens of Van Zandt County met to protest the secession. The practice of slavery was infrequent in the county. Slave owners, worried about losing their slaves in the Civil War, refused to bring their slaves to Van Zandt, because slavery was so uncommon there. The majority of Van Zandt wanted to stay with the Union, and reasoned that if Texas could secede from the United States, they could secede from Texas, and began organizing a government until they were threatened with military intervention. Although the secession was unsuccessful, the title of "Free State" stuck.

After Texas re-entered the Union after the Civil War, Van Zandt County again tried to secede from Texas, the Confederate States of America, and the United States. A convention was held in 1867 in which the citizens elected delegates, and the delegates voted for secession, and penned a Declaration of Independence modeled after the United States Declaration of Independence. The event was seen as a rebellion by the nation, and when word reached General Sheridan, he dispatched a cavalry unit to quell it. The citizens of Van Zandt called an emergency meeting that ended with the delegates declaring war on the United States. The wooded landscape at the time made moving difficult for horses, so the citizens of Van Zandt, familiar with the area, were able to ambush the unit, until they retreated. The citizens, elated with their victory, celebrated with an excess of alcohol. During their celebration, they were surrounded by Sheridan's troops, and were put in anklets and in a rough prison of wooden posts. Two ex-Confederate soldiers, W.A. Allen and Hardy Allen, were in the group, and W.A. Allen used a hidden knife to wear down the anklets. A combination of the beginning of the rainy season  and a decreasing of the guard to one man  allowed the prisoners to easily escape. After that, not much action on the part of Van Zandt or the United States was taken in the issue. Arrest warrants were sent, but none was carried out, and none of the prisoners went to trial.

Geography
Van Zandt County is unique in topography. The western and northwestern parts of the county are in the eastern edge of the Texas Blackland Prairies, the central part of the county is located in the post oak belt of Northeast Texas, and the eastern part of the county stretches into the East Texas Piney Woods. Two major rivers, the Neches and the Sabine, flow through Van Zandt County. Van Zandt County is referred to as the "Gateway to East Texas" due to its diverse topography.

Major highways 
  Interstate 20
  U.S. Highway 80
  State Highway 19
  State Highway 64
  State Highway 110
  State Highway 198

Adjacent counties
 Rains County (north)
 Wood County (northeast)
 Smith County (east)
 Henderson County (south)
 Kaufman County (west)
 Hunt County (northwest)

Communities

Cities
 Canton (county seat)
 Edgewood
 Grand Saline
 Van
 Wills Point

Towns
 Edom
 Fruitvale

Census-designated places
 Ben Wheeler
 Callender Lake
 Myrtle Springs

Other unincorporated communities
 Alsa
 Colfax
 Martin's Mill
 Midway
 Oakland
 Phalba
 Primrose
 Silver Lake
 Tundra
 Walton
 Wentworth
 Wise

Ghost towns

 Cana
 Clifton
 Clower
 Corinth
 Denman Crossroads
 Elwood
 Four Mile Prairie
 Holly Springs
 Jackson
 Jones
 Lawrence Springs
 Mars
 Odom
 Owlet Green
 Pruitt
 Redland
 Roddy
 Sand Flat
 Scott
 Small
 Wallace
 Watkins
 Whitton

Demographics

Note: the US Census treats Hispanic/Latino as an ethnic category. This table excludes Latinos from the racial categories and assigns them to a separate category. Hispanics/Latinos can be of any race.

As of the census of 2000, 48,140 people, 18,195 households, and 13,664 families resided in the county. The population density was 57 people per square mile (22/km2). The 20,896 housing units averaged 25 per square mile (10/km2). The racial makeup of the county was 91.96% White, 2.94% African American, 0.62% Native American, 0.18% Asian,  2.74% from other races, and 1.56% from two or more races.  About 6.65% of the population was Hispanic or Latino of any race.

Of the 18,195 households, 31.80% had children under the age of 18 living with them, 62.60% were married couples living together, 8.70% had a female householder with no husband present, and 24.90% were not families. Around 22.00% of all households were made up of individuals, and 11.60% had someone living alone who was 65 years of age or older. The average household size was 2.59 and the average family size was 3.01.

In the county, the population was distributed as 25.50% under the age of 18, 7.30% from 18 to 24, 25.20% from 25 to 44, 24.90% from 45 to 64, and 17.00% who were 65 years of age or older.  The median age was 40 years. For every 100 females, there were 97.00 males.  For every 100 females age 18 and over, there were 93.70 males.

The median income for a household in the county was $35,029, and for a family was $41,175. Males had a median income of $31,887 versus $21,344 for females. The per capita income for the county was $16,930.  About 10.30% of families and 13.30% of the population were below the poverty line, including 15.90% of those under age 18 and 12.10% of those age 65 or over.

Media
The only radio station licensed to Van Zandt County is KWJB broadcasting on 1510 AM and 95.1 FM. Van Zandt County receives outlying signals on the outer signal edges of Dallas/Fort Worth DMA. Local media outlets are: KDFW-TV, KXAS-TV, WFAA-TV, KTVT-TV, KERA-TV, KTXA-TV, KDFI-TV, KDAF-TV, and KFWD-TV. Other nearby stations that provide coverage for Van Zandt County come from the Tyler/Longview/Jacksonville market and they include: KLTV, KYTX-TV, KFXK-TV, KCEB-TV, and KETK-TV.

Newspapers and publications
 Canton Herald
 Wills Point Chronicle
 Canton Guide
 Van Zandt County News
 East Texas Homes and Farms

Government and politics

County commissioners

County officials

Transportation

Airports 
 Van Zandt County Regional Airport (Wills Point)
 Canton-Hackney Airport (Canton)

See also
 National Register of Historic Places listings in Van Zandt County, Texas
 Recorded Texas Historic Landmarks in Van Zandt County
 Bob Hall, member of the Texas State Senate from Van Zandt County

References

Sources
 Clausen, C. A. ed., The Lady with the Pen: Elise Wærenskjold in Texas (Northfield, Minnesota: Norwegian-American Historical Association, 1961)
 Hall, Margaret Elizabeth A History of Van Zandt County (Austin, Texas: Jenkins, 1976)

External links
 Van Zandt County government's website
 KWJB RADIO the only broadcasting station in Van Zandt County
 Van Zandt County News
 

 
1848 establishments in Texas
Populated places established in 1848